Deccani (also known as Deccani Urdu and Deccani Hindi) or Dakni, Dakhni, Dakhini, Dakkhani and Dakkani (dekanī or , dakhanī), is a variety of Hindustani spoken in the Deccan region of India and the native language of the Deccani people. Commonly associated with Urdu, the historical dialect sparked the development of Urdu literature during the late-Mughal period, and was a predecessor to and later influenced modern standard Hindi. It arose as a lingua franca under the Delhi and Bahmani Sultanates, as trade and migration from the north introduced Hindustani to Southern India. It later developed a literary tradition under the patronage of the Deccan Sultanates. In the modern era, it has survived only as a spoken lect. Deccani differs from Hindustani due to archaisms retained from the medieval era, as well as convergence with regional languages like Marathi, Telugu and Kannada spoken in the states of Maharashtra, Telangana, Andhra Pradesh and Karnataka. In recent times, Deccani has been increasingly influenced by Standard Urdu, which serves as its formal register.

The term "Deccani" and its variants are often used in two different contexts: a historical, obsolete one, referring to the medieval-era literary predecessor of Hindi-Urdu; and an oral one, referring to the lect spoken in many areas of the Deccan today. Both contexts have intricate historical ties.

History

Origin  
As a predecessor of modern Hindustani, Deccani has its origins in the contact dialect spoken around Delhi known as Dehlavi. In the early 14th century, this dialect was introduced in the Deccan region through the military exploits of Alauddin Khalji. In 1327 AD, Muhammad bin Tughluq shifted his Sultanate's capital from Delhi to Daulatabad (near present-day Aurangabad, Maharashtra), causing a mass migration; governors, soldiers and common people moved south, bringing the dialect with them. At this time (and for the next few centuries) the cultural centres of the northern Indian subcontinent were under Persian linguistic hegemony.

The Bahmani Sultanate was formed in 1347 AD with Daulatabad as its capital. This was later moved to Gulbarga and once again, in 1430, to Bidar. By this time, the dialect had acquired the name Dakhni, from the name of the region itself, and had become a lingua franca for the linguistically diverse people of the region, primarily where the Muslims had settled permanently. The Bahmanids greatly promoted Persian, and did not show any notable patronage for Deccani. However, their 150-year rule saw the burgeoning of a local Deccani literary culture outside the court, as religious texts were made in the language. The Sufis in the region (such as Shah Miranji) were an important vehicle of Deccani; they used it in their preachings since regional languages were more accessible (than Persian) to the general population. This era also saw production of the masnavi Kadam Rao Padam Rao by Fakhruddin Nizami in the region around Bidar. It is the earliest available manuscript of the Hindavi/Dehlavi/Deccani language, and contains loanwords from local languages such as Telugu and Marathi. Digby suggests that it was not produced in courtly settings.

Growth 

In the early 16th century, the Bahmani Sultanate splintered into the Deccan Sultanates. These were also Persianate in culture, but were characterised by an affinity towards regional languages. They are largely responsible for the development of the Deccani literary tradition, which became concentrated at Golconda and Bijapur. Numerous Deccani poets were patronised in this time. According to Shaheen and Shahid, Golconda was the literary home of Asadullah Wajhi (author of Sab Ras), ibn-e-Nishati (Phulban), and Ghwasi (Tutinama). Bijapur played host to Hashmi Bijapuri, San‘ati, and Mohammed Nusrati over the years.

The rulers themselves participated in these cultural developments. Muhammad Quli Qutb Shah of the Golconda Sultanate wrote poetry in Deccani, which was compiled into a Kulliyat. It is widely considered to be the earliest Urdu poetry of a secular nature. Ibrahim Adil Shah II of the Bijapur Sultanate produced Kitab-e-Navras (Book of the Nine Rasas), a work of musical poetry written entirely in Deccani.

Although the poets of this era were well-versed in Persian, they were characterised by a preference for indigenous cultures, and a drive to stay independent of esoteric language. As a result, the language they cultivated emphasised the Sanskritic roots of Deccani without overshadowing it, and borrowed from neighbouring languages (especially Marathi; Matthews states that Dravidian influence was much less). In this regard, Shaheen and Shahid note that literary Deccani has historically been very close to spoken Deccani, unlike the northern tradition that has always exhibited diglossia. Poet San'ati is a particular example of such conscious efforts to retain simplicity:

As the language of court and culture, Persian nevertheless served as the model for poetic forms, and a good amount of Persian and Arabic vocabulary was present in the works of these writers. Hence Deccani attempted to strike a balance between Indian and Persian influences, though it did always retain mutual intelligibility with the northern Dehlavi. This contributed to the cultivation of a distinct Deccani identity, separate from the rulers from the north; many poets proudly extolled the Deccan region and its culture.

Hence, Deccani experienced cultivation into a literary language under the Sultanates, alongside its usage as a common vernacular. It also continued to be used by saints and Sufis for preaching. However, the Sultanates did not use Deccani for official purposes, preferring the prestige language Persian as well as regional languages like Marathi, Kannada, and Telugu.

Decline 
The Mughal conquest of the Deccan by Aurangzeb in the 17th century connected the southern regions of the subcontinent to the north, and introduced a hegemony of northern tastes. This began the decline of Deccani poetry, as literary patronage in the region decreased. The sociopolitical context of the period is reflected in Hashmi Bijapuri's poem, composed two years after the fall of Bijapur, in a time when many southern poets were pressured to change their language and style for patronage:

The literary centres of the Deccan had been replaced by the capital of the Mughals, so poets migrated to Delhi for better opportunities. A notable example is that of Wali Deccani (1667–1707), who adapted his Deccani sensibilities to the northern style and produced a divan in this variety. His work inspired the Persianate poets of the north to compose in the local dialect, which in their hands became an intermediate predecessor of Hindustani known as Rekhta. This accelerated the downfall of Deccani literature, as Rekhta came to dominate the competing dialects of Mughal Hindustan. The advent of the Asaf Jahis slowed this down, but despite their patronage of regional culture, Deccani Urdu's literary tradition died. However, the spoken variety has lived on in the Deccani Muslims, retaining some of its historical features and continuing to be influenced by the neighbouring Dravidian languages.

Phonology

Consonants 

Vowels 

  can have lax allophones of  when preceding consonants in medial position.
 Diphthong sounds include .
  can be heard as  after .

Modern era
The term Deccani today is given to a Hindustani lect spoken natively by many Muslims from Telangana, Andhra Pradesh, Karnataka and Maharashtra (who are known as the Deccanis). It is considered to be the modern, spoken variety of the historical Deccani dialect, and inherits many features from it. The term Deccani distinguishes the lect from standard Urdu - however, it is commonly considered a "variety" of Urdu, and often gets subsumed under this name, both by its own speakers and the official administration. The demise of the literary tradition has meant that Deccani uses standard Urdu as its formal register (i.e. for writing, news, education etc).

Geographical distribution 
Deccani speakers centre around Hyderabad, the capital of Telangana. Deccani is also spoken in many other urban areas of the Deccan region and Mumbai, especially those with large Muslim populations such as Bijapur and Gulbarga.

Features 
Deccani is characterised by the retention of medieval-era features from Hindustani's predecessor dialects, that have disappeared in today's Hindi-Urdu. It is also distinguished by grammar and vocabulary influences from Marathi, Kannada, and Telugu, due to its prolonged use as a lingua franca in the Deccan. A non-exhaustive list of its unique features, compared with standard Urdu where possible:

These features are used to different degrees among speakers, as there tends to be regional variation. Mustafa names some varieties of Deccani as "(Telugu) Dakkhini, Kannada Dakkhini, and Tamil Dakkhini", based on their influence from the dominant Dravidian language in the spoken region. He further divides Telugu Deccani into two linguistic categories, corresponding to: Andhra Pradesh, which he says has more Telugu influence; and Telangana, with more influence from standard Urdu. The latter is seen especially in Hyderabadi Urdu.

Deccani's use of Urdu as a standard register, and contact with Hindustani (widespread in India), has led to some of its distinctive features disappearing. Hence many of the features in the above table are used side-by-side with those of Standard Urdu.

Culture 
Deccani finds a cultural core in and around Hyderabad, where the highest concentration of speakers are; Telangana is one of the only four states of India to provide "Urdu" official status. Deccani Urdu in Hyderabad has found a vehicle of expression through humour and wit, which manifests in events called "Mazahiya Mushaira", poetic symposiums with comedic themes. An example of Deccani, spoken in such a context at Hyderabad:

Additionally, the Deccani Film Industry is based in Hyderabad, and its movies are produced in Hyderabadi Urdu.

Legacy

Hindustani
Deccani is often considered a predecessor of Hindustani. The Deccani literary tradition is largely responsible for the development of modern Hindustani since contact with southern poets led to a shift in northern tastes and the development of Urdu as a literary language. Deccani also imparted the practice of writing the local vernacular in the Perso-Arabic script, which eventually became the standard practice for Urdu all over the Indian subcontinent.

See also
 Hyderabadi Urdu
 Urdu in Aurangabad
 Nawayathi (Kumta, Honnavar, Bhatkal)
 Deccani Muslims
 Deccani Film Industry
 Deccani Marathi, which goes by the same names

References

Bibliography

Further reading
 
Urban culture of Medieval Deccan (1300 AD-1650 AD)
Bulletin of the Deccan College Post-Graduate and Research Institute, Volume 22 (1963)
Deccani Painting by Mark Zebrowski

Culture of Hyderabad, India
Dialects of Urdu
Urdu in India
Languages of Telangana
Languages of India
Deccan sultanates